Russell Hill is an area in the London Borough of Croydon, located to the north-west of Purley.

It is named after the former prime minister John Russell, 1st Earl Russell, who was President of the Warehousemen, Clerks and Drapers School which was built here in 1886; prior to this the locality was known as Beggar's Thorn or Beggar's Bush. The area is now home to Margaret Roper Catholic Primary School and Thomas More Catholic School.

References

Areas of London
Districts of the London Borough of Croydon